A sentence diagram is a pictorial representation of the grammatical structure of a sentence. The term "sentence diagram" is used more when teaching written language, where sentences are diagrammed. The model shows the relations between words and the nature of sentence structure and can be used as a tool to help recognize which potential sentences are actual sentences.

History 
Most methods of diagramming in pedagogy are based on the work of Alonzo Reed and Brainerd Kellogg. Some teachers continue to use the Reed–Kellogg system in teaching grammar, but others have discouraged it in favor of more modern tree diagrams.

Reed–Kellogg system

Simple sentences in the Reed–Kellogg system are diagrammed according to these forms:

	 
The diagram of a simple sentence begins with a horizontal line called the base. The subject is written on the left, the predicate on the right, separated by a vertical bar that extends through the base. The predicate must contain a verb, and the verb either requires other sentence elements to complete the predicate, permits them to do so, or precludes them from doing so. The verb and its object, when present, are separated by a line that ends at the baseline. If the object is a direct object, the line is vertical. If the object is a predicate noun or adjective, the line looks like a backslash, \, sloping toward the subject.

Modifiers of the subject, predicate, or object are placed below the baseline:

Modifiers, such as adjectives (including articles) and adverbs, are placed on slanted lines below the word they modify. Prepositional phrases are also placed beneath the word they modify; the preposition goes on a slanted line and the slanted line leads to a horizontal line on which the object of the preposition is placed.

These basic diagramming conventions are augmented for other types of sentence structures, e.g. for coordination and subordinate clauses.

Constituency and dependency
The connections to modern principles for constructing parse trees are present in the Reed–Kellogg diagrams, although Reed and Kellogg understood such principles only implicitly. The principles are now regarded as the constituency relation of phrase structure grammars and the dependency relation of dependency grammars. These two relations are illustrated here adjacent to each other for comparison, where D means Determiner, N means Noun, NP means Noun Phrase, S means Sentence, V means Verb, VP means Verb Phrase and IP means Inflectional Phrase.

Constituency is a one-to-one-or-more relation; every word in the sentence corresponds to one or more nodes in the tree diagram. Dependency, in contrast, is a one-to-one relation; every word in the sentence corresponds to exactly one node in the tree diagram. Both parse trees employ the convention where the category acronyms (e.g. N, NP, V, VP) are used as the labels on the nodes in the tree. The one-to-one-or-more constituency relation is capable of increasing the amount of sentence structure to the upper limits of what is possible. The result can be very "tall" trees, such as those associated with X-bar theory. Both constituency-based and dependency-based theories of grammar have established traditions.

Reed–Kellogg diagrams employ both of these modern tree generating relations. The constituency relation is present in the Reed–Kellogg diagrams insofar as subject, verb, object, and/or predicate are placed equi-level on the horizontal base line of the sentence and divided by a vertical or slanted line. In a Reed–Kellogg diagram, the vertical dividing line that crosses the base line corresponds to the binary division in the constituency-based tree (S → NP + VP), and the second vertical dividing line that does not cross the baseline (between verb and object) corresponds to the binary division of VP into verb and direct object (VP → V + NP). Thus the vertical and slanting lines that cross or rest on the baseline correspond to the constituency relation. The dependency relation, in contrast, is present insofar as modifiers dangle off of or appear below the words that they modify.

Functional breakdown
A sentence may also be broken down by functional parts: subject, object, adverbial, verb (predicator). The subject is the owner of an action, the verb represents the action, the object represents the recipient of the action, and the adverbial qualifies the action. The various parts can be phrases rather than individual words.

See also
 Parse tree
 Unparser

References

Further reading

Primary sources 
 Clark, W. (1847). A practical grammar: In which words, phrases & sentences are classified according to their offices and their various relationships to each another. Cincinnati: H. W. Barnes & Company.
 Reed, A. and B. Kellogg (1877). Higher Lessons in English.
 Reed, A. and B. Kellogg (1896). Graded Lessons in English: An Elementary English Grammar. .
 Reed, A. and B. Kellogg (1896). Graded Lessons in English: An Elementary English Grammar Consisting of One Hundred Practical Lessons, Carefully Graded and Adapted to the Class-Room.

Critical sources 
 Kitty Burns Florey (2006). Sister Bernadette's Barking Dog. Melville House Publishing. .
 Mazziotta, N. (2016). "Drawing syntax before syntactic trees: Stephen Watkins Clark's sentence diagrams (1847)". Historiographia Linguistica, 43(3), 301–342. .

External links 

 Sentence Diagramming by Eugene R. Moutoux
 Grammar Revolution—The English Grammar Exercise Page by Elizabeth O'Brien
 GrammarBrain - Sentence Diagramming Rules
 SenGram, an iPhone and iPad app that presents sentence diagrams as puzzles.
 Diagramming Sentences, including many advanced configurations
 SenDraw, a computer program that specializes in Reed–Kellogg diagrams
 

Diagrams
English grammar
Grammar
Syntax
Generative syntax